The Church of the Assumption of the Blessed Virgin Mary  is a Roman Catholic church in the Trakų Street, Vilnius' Old Town, which was established by Franciscans.

The first Franciscan church was built at the end of the 13th century in this site, however it was rebuilt in 1421 because the initial church was burned down during an attack by the Crusaders in 1390.

References

Roman Catholic churches completed in 1421
15th-century Roman Catholic church buildings in Lithuania
Gothic architecture in Lithuania
Baroque architecture in Lithuania
Roman Catholic churches in Vilnius